Karl Peter Karlsson (born 29 May 1969 in Stenstorp, Sweden) is a table tennis player. He was 1991 World Champion in men's doubles (with Thomas von Scheele), and 2000 European Champion in men's singles.

Commitment
Peter Karlsson .is today a member of the ‘Champions for Peace’ club, a group of 54 famous elite athletes committed to serving peace in the world through sport, created by Peace and Sport, a Monaco-based international organization.

In October 2010, Peter Karlsson visited Dili in East Timor to launch 'Ping Pong Ba Dame'  (Ping Pong for Peace), an initiative from Peace and Sport and the International Table Tennis Federation (ITTF).

Career records
Singles
Olympics: round of 32 (2000, 04).
World Championships: QF (1995, 2005).
World Cup appearances: 6. Record: 4th (1993).
Pro Tour winner (×1): 2002 Italian Open. Runner-up (×3): 1997 Austrian Open; 2003 Croatian Open; 2004 Russian Open.
Pro Tour Grand Finals appearances: 3. Record: round of 16 (2002, 03, 04).
European Championships: winner (2000); SF (1996).
Europe Top-12: 2nd (1993, 98, 2001); 3rd (1994).

Men's doubles
Olympics: round of 16 (2000).
World Championships: winner (1991).
Pro Tour Grand Finals appearances: 2. Record: QF (2002, 03).
European Championships: SF (1990, 92).

Mixed doubles
World Championships: round of 128 (1989).

Team
World Championships: 1st (1989, 91, 93, 2000); 2nd (1995); 3rd (2001).
World Team Cup: 2nd (1991, 94).
European Championships: 1st (1990, 92, 96, 2000, 02); 2nd (1994).

References

External links
 

1969 births
Living people
Swedish male table tennis players
Olympic table tennis players of Sweden
Table tennis players at the 1996 Summer Olympics
Table tennis players at the 2000 Summer Olympics
Table tennis players at the 2004 Summer Olympics
World Table Tennis Championships medalists
People from Falköping Municipality
Sportspeople from Västra Götaland County
20th-century Swedish people
21st-century Swedish people